The U.S. Department of Energy’s (DOE's) Building Energy Codes Program (BECP) was established in 1991 (originally called the Building Standards and Guidelines Program), with its activities defined by the Energy Conservation and Production Act (ECPA) (Pub. L. No 94-385), as amended, and the Energy Independence and Security Act (EISA) (Pub. L. No 110-140). These statutes direct  DOE to participate in industry processes to develop model building energy codes, issue determinations as to whether updated codes result in energy savings, and provide technical assistance to states to implement and comply with the codes. The BECP is part of DOE’s Energy Efficiency and Renewable Energy Building Technologies Office.

Program Areas
BECP focuses on three key building energy code areas: model code development, adoption, and compliance.

Model Code Development
DOE is directed by statute to review the technical and economic basis of building energy codes and participate in processes for their review and modification, including adoption of all technologically feasible and economically justified energy efficiency measures.

Adoption
DOE is directed by statute to provide technical assistance to states implementing building energy codes, including the adoption of all technologically feasible and economically justified efficiency measures, as well as encouraging states to adopt updated building energy codes.

Compliance
DOE is directed by statute to provide technical assistance to states implementing energy codes.

See also
American Society of Heating, Refrigerating and Air-Conditioning Engineers
Building Codes Assistance Project
Energy Conservation and Production Act
International Code Council
International Energy Conservation Code
United States Energy Building Codes
United States Department of Energy

References

External links
http://www.tailoredenergyonline.net
 Mapjects provides a management framework for auditing both energy and environmental compliance based on building and LEED codes
Building Energy Codes Program - REScheck
Building Energy Codes Program - COMcheck

Building engineering
Construction industry of the United States
Real estate in the United States
Building codes
Legal codes
Energy conservation